Agate is a surname shared by several notable people, including:

 Alfred Thomas Agate (1812–1846), American painter and miniaturist
 Frederick Styles Agate (1803–1844), American painter
 James Agate (1877–1947), English literary critic
 Jeffery Agate (1919–1977), British managing director of a DuPont factory
 Mariano Agate (born 1939), Sicilian (Italian) organized crime figure

See also
 Agate (disambiguation)
 Agata (surname)